The 2016 Stephen F. Austin Lumberjacks football team represented Stephen F. Austin State University in the 2016 NCAA Division I FCS football season. The Lumberjacks were led by third-year head coach Clint Conque and played their home games at Homer Bryce Stadium. They were members of the Southland Conference. They finished the season 5–6, 4–5 in Southland play to finish in sixth place.

Previous season
The Lumberjacks finished the season 4–7 overall and finished in a three-way tie for fifth place with a 4–5 record in conference play.

Schedule
Source:

Game summaries

@ Texas Tech

Sources:

West Alabama

Sources:

@ McNeese State

Sources:

Abilene Christian

Sam Houston State

Sources:

@ Nicholls

Sources:

Southeastern Louisiana

Sources:

@ Incarnate Word

Sources: Box Score

Central Arkansas

Sources:

@ Houston Baptist

Sources:

Northwestern State

Sources:

References

Stephen F. Austin
Stephen F. Austin Lumberjacks football seasons
Stephen F. Austin Lumberjacks football